The women's 90 kg event at the 2017 Summer Universiade was held on 25 August 2017 at the Tamkang University Shao-Mo Memorial Gymnasium 7F.

Records 
Prior to this competition, the existing world and Universiade records were as follows:

 Initial records

 Broken record

Results

References 

2017 in women's weightlifting
Women's 90 kg